Hallie Anderson (January 5, 1885 – November 9, 1927) was an American dance orchestra conductor and theater band director during the Harlem Renaissance.

Anderson was born in Lynchburg, Virginia, and died in New York City in 1927.

References

1885 births
1927 deaths
People from Lynchburg, Virginia
American conductors (music)